Ayasha Rahman Shukhtara Boishakhi (born 2 February 1994) is a Bangladeshi cricketer who plays for the Bangladesh cricket team. She plays as a right-handed batter and right-arm off break bowler. Rahman was born in Khulna, Bangladesh.

Career
Rahman was a member of the team that won a silver medal in cricket against the China national women's cricket team at the 2010 Asian Games in Guangzhou, China.

Rahman made her ODI debut against Pakistan on 23 August 2012. Rahman made her T20I debut against India on 5 April 2013. In June 2018, she was part of Bangladesh's squad that won their first ever Women's Asia Cup title, winning the 2018 Women's Twenty20 Asia Cup tournament. Later the same month, she was named in Bangladesh's squad for the 2018 ICC Women's World Twenty20 Qualifier tournament. She was the leading run-scorer for Bangladesh in the tournament, with 89 runs in five matches. Following the conclusion of the tournament, she was named as the rising star of Bangladesh's squad by the International Cricket Council (ICC).

In October 2018, she was named in Bangladesh's squad for the 2018 ICC Women's World Twenty20 tournament in the West Indies. She was the leading run-scorer for Bangladesh in the tournament, with 59 runs in four matches.

In August 2019, she was named in Bangladesh's squad for the 2019 ICC Women's World Twenty20 Qualifier tournament in Scotland. In November 2019, she was named in Bangladesh's squad for the cricket tournament at the 2019 South Asian Games. The Bangladesh team beat Sri Lanka by two runs in the final to win the gold medal. In January 2020, she was named in Bangladesh's squad for the 2020 ICC Women's T20 World Cup in Australia.

References

External links
 
 

1994 births
Living people
People from Khulna
Bangladeshi women cricketers
Bangladesh women One Day International cricketers
Bangladesh women Twenty20 International cricketers
Khulna Division women cricketers
Cricketers at the 2010 Asian Games
Asian Games medalists in cricket
Cricketers at the 2014 Asian Games
Asian Games silver medalists for Bangladesh
Medalists at the 2010 Asian Games
Medalists at the 2014 Asian Games
South Asian Games gold medalists for Bangladesh
South Asian Games medalists in cricket